Pratappur is a "Nagar panchayat" area of Pilkha constituency of Chhattisgarh in India and is a part of the Surajpur District. It is known for the Lord Shiva temple in Shivpur, a tourist destination. The Tropic of Cancer passes through Pratappur.

Notable Personalities
 Raja Bahadur BINDESHWARI PRASAD Singh Deo Bahadur C.S.I

 Ramsevek Painkra (Hon'ble Ex Home Minister, C.G Government)

 PREMSAY SINGH (School education minister, C.G Government)

See also
Surajpur District

Cities and towns in Surajpur district